Nadia Min Dern Heng (born 1 January 1985 in Negeri Sembilan, Malaysia) is a Malaysian beauty pageant titleholder and model who won Miss World Malaysia 2010 and represented Malaysia at Miss World 2010 on October 30 in China.

Early life
Heng is of a mixture of Chinese father and English mother parentage. She has a fraternal twin sister Natalie who was born a minute older than her. Her father used to work in Port Dickson's hotel industry before his retirement and her mother is an administrator at a nursing home in England. Nadia has appeared in more than 20 TV commercials and print advertisements, among them jobs for Spritzer and Gintell.

Personal life
Heng graduated with a Degree in communications from Universiti Sains Malaysia in 2006 and used to work as a public relations manager. She is now a professional emcee and host for some of the biggest brands. She loves reading, running, singing, swimming and travelling. She told the interviewer that her Personal Motto is ‘Life is a self-fulfilling prophecy. Learn to live, enjoy the moment.

Nadia describes herself as a versatile, determined, sociable and diligent person. She says that her future ambition is to have a successful accessories and clothing line. In college, Nadia received the best student award during her diploma in public relations. She is fluent in English, Mandarin, and Malay.

Career

Miss World Malaysia 2010
Nadia competed in the Miss World Malaysia 2010 and won the title. She then represented Malaysia in the Miss World 2010 held in Sanya, China.

Miss World 2010
Nadia competed in the Miss World 2010 but was unplaced.

References

External links
 Nadia Heng Official website
 

1985 births
Living people
People from Negeri Sembilan
Malaysian people of English descent
Malaysian people of British descent
Malaysian people of Chinese descent
Malaysian twins
Malaysian socialites
Malaysian beauty pageant winners
Miss World 2010 delegates
Universiti Sains Malaysia alumni
21st-century Malaysian actresses